This is a list of presidents of the Senate of Belize. 
The president of the Senate is either elected from among the appointed members, or from outside the Senate.

References

Senate
Belize, Senate